is a passenger railway station located in the city of Kuroshio, Hata District, Kōchi Prefecture, Japan. It is operated by the Tosa Kuroshio Railway and has the station number "TK36".

Lines
Only local trains stop at the station.

Layout
The station consists of an island platform serving two tracks on an embankment above the roads and farmland on either side. Steps lead up from a secondary road to an underpass which gives access to the island platform which has a shelter for waiting passengers. The station is unstaffed.

Adjacent stations

|-
!colspan=5|Tosa Kuroshio Railway

History
The station opened on 1 October 1970 under the control of Japanese National Railways (JNR). After the privatization of JNR, control of the station passed to Tosa Kuroshio Railway on 1 April 1988.

Passenger statistics
In fiscal 2011, the station was used by an average of 40 passengers daily.

Surrounding area
The settlement surrounding the station is shown on maps as Ukibuchi but is part of the town of Kuroshio.
National Route 56 runs along the coast while the track in the vicinity of the station runs further inland but the road is only about 500 metres away.
Bios Oogata Road Station - a service station 1 km away on National Route 56.
Irino Matsubara Campground 入野松原キャンプ場（土佐西南大規模公園内）, a campsite within the Tosa Southwest Large Scale Park.

See also
 List of Railway Stations in Japan

References

External links

Railway stations in Kōchi Prefecture
Railway stations in Japan opened in 1970
Kuroshio, Kōchi